John Chryselios was a provincial magnate in late 10th-century Dyrrhachium, and the father-in-law of Tsar Samuel of Bulgaria.

Biography
Bulgarian in origin, Chryselios was the "leading man" (proteuon) of Dyrrhachium. According to another opinion, his name is not Bulgarian and there is no evidence that Chryselios was Bulgarian; it is suggested that he was of Armenian Paulician or Bogomil origin.

According to a note on the history of John Skylitzes, the Bulgarian tsar Samuel married Chryselios's daughter Agatha, who was taken captive after Samuel sacked the city of Larissa. It is possible that thereby Samuel managed to acquire control over the strategically important Adriatic port city.  

After the Battle of Spercheios in 997, Samuel made his son-in-law Ashot Taronites, a Byzantine captive who had married his daughter Miroslava, governor of the city. In circa 1005, however, Ashot and Miroslava, with the connivance of Chryselios, fled on a Byzantine ship to Constantinople, bearing a letter by Chryselios that promised to hand over the city to the Byzantine emperor, Basil II, in exchange for the rank of patrikios for himself and his two sons. Soon, a Byzantine squadron appeared off the city under Eustathios Daphnomeles, and the city returned to Byzantine rule, but Chryselios had died in the meantime. It is, however, possible that this episode actually took place as late as 1018, at the end of the Bulgarian war, since the chronology of the war's primary source, John Skylitzes, is unclear; while the Italian chronicle of Lupus Protospatharius gives a completely different date for the recovery of Dyrrhachium, 1004/5, and does not mention Chryselios at all.

Family
Apart from his daughter Agatha, modern Bulgarian scholars equate a patrikios Nicholas Chryselios or Nicholas the Bulgarian, recorded by Skylitzes as being active under Romanos III Argyros, with one of John Chryselios' sons. A certain Theodoretos, who was the father of Kosara, the wife of Prince Jovan Vladimir of Duklja, has also been suggested by modern scholarship as one of Chryselios' sons.

References

Sources

10th-century Bulgarian people
10th-century Byzantine people
History of Durrës
Bulgarian people of the Byzantine–Bulgarian Wars
Byzantine people of Slavic descent